Lorisa  Byurbyuyevna Oorzhak (born August 10, 1985) is a female wrestler from Russia.

External links
 bio on fila-wrestling.com
 sports-reference.com

Living people
1985 births
Russian female sport wrestlers
Olympic wrestlers of Russia
Wrestlers at the 2004 Summer Olympics

World Wrestling Championships medalists
21st-century Russian women